The Irrefutable Truth about Demons is a New Zealand horror film released in 2000. It was directed by Glenn Standring and stars Karl Urban, Katie Wolfe, and Jonathon Hendry.

The film's UK DVD title is The Truth About Demons.

Plot
Haughty anthropology professor Harry Ballard (Karl Urban) receives a sinister videotape showing a cult called the Black Lodge ranting about a demonic plot. As it turns out, Harry's brother, Richard, killed himself a few months earlier under mysterious circumstances, possibly related to this cult; in any event, the loss has been preying on Harry's mind, sending his relationship with his girlfriend (Sally Stockwell) into a tailspin. Meanwhile, a seemingly schizophrenic young woman named Benny (Katie Wolfe), who has a penchant for lighting sparklers in alleyways for no good reason, follows Harry around and snatches him from the jaws of doom after he falls into the cult's hands. The devilish leader, Le Valliant (Jonathan Hendry), apparently has big plans in store for Harry, and soon the protagonist's grip on reality slips as the cult targets him for an upcoming ritual.

Critical reception 
AllMovie gave the film a positive review, calling it "a clever, gleefully ludicrous flick".

References

External links

MSN Movies Review

2000 films
2000 horror films
New Zealand horror films
2000s English-language films